Wayfaring Stranger is a 2001 album of English-language folksongs by the German countertenor Andreas Scholl.

Track list
I am a poor wayfaring stranger
The Salley Gardens
My Love Is Like A Red, Red Rose
Wild Mountain Thyme
Henry Martin
Charming Beauty Bright
I Will Give my Love an Apple
She Moved Through the Fair
Blow the Wind Southerly
The Wife of Usher's Well
I Loved a Lass
Pretty Saro
Down in Yon Forest
Barbara Allen
The wraggle taggle gypsies, o!
Annie Laurie
Black is the Colour

References

2001 classical albums